Aareschlucht West railway station is a railway station in the municipality of Meiringen, in the Swiss canton of Bern. It is located on the  Meiringen–Innertkirchen line of the Meiringen-Innertkirchen-Bahn (MIB). The station is adjacent to the Aare river and located just west of the Aare Gorge.

The station is named "West" as opposed to the station Aareschlucht Ost MIB railway station, "East" of the gorge.

Services 
 the following services stop at Aareschlucht West:

References

External links 
 

Railway stations in the canton of Bern
Meiringen-Innertkirchen-Bahn stations